Wooden Spoon may refer to:

 Wooden spoon, implement
 Wooden spoon (award)
 Australian rugby league wooden spooners
 County Championship Wooden Spoons
 List of Australian Football League wooden spoons
 MLS Wooden Spoon
 Wooden Spoon Society
 Ruspoli Sapphire, aka the Wooden Spoon-Seller's Sapphire